Metopoplax is a genus of true bugs in the family Oxycarenidae. There are at least three described species in Metopoplax.

Species
These three species belong to the genus Metopoplax:
 Metopoplax ditomoides (A. Costa, 1847) c g b
 Metopoplax fuscinervis Stal, C., 1872 c g
 Metopoplax origani (Kolenati, F.A., 1845) c g
Data sources: i = ITIS, c = Catalogue of Life, g = GBIF, b = Bugguide.net

References

Further reading

External links

 

Lygaeoidea